The Angel Who Pawned Her Harp (German: Der Engel, der seine Harfe versetzte) is a 1959 West German fantasy comedy film directed by Kurt Hoffmann and starring Nana Osten, Henry Vahl and Ullrich Haupt. It was shot at the Bavaria Studios in Munich. The film is based on the novel of the same title by Charles Terrot which had previously been made into a British film in 1954.

Plot

An angel arrives on earth tasked with improving the world.

The main task involves conning a pawnbroker (who specialises in old musical instruments) into believing her harp is valuable. This is set up by organising a "chance meeting" in a pub and convincing him, through a man talking, that he could obtain a valuable harp.

Cast
 Nana Osten as Der Engel 
 Henry Vahl as Joshua Webmann 
 Ullrich Haupt as Hinrich Prigge 
 Matthias Fuchs as Klaas Henning 
 Tatjana Sais as Frau Henning 
 Dunja Movar as Lissy Haverkamp 
 Eva Vaitl as Frau Haverkamp 
 Hans Cossy as Herr Haverkamp 
 Gisela Peltzer as Frau Petersen 
 Lina Carstens as Frau Feuerhake 
 Monika John as Elise 
 Horst Tappert as Herr Parker 
 Alexander Hunzinger as Schätzer 
 Marie Ferron
 Carl Simon
 Wolfgang Dohnberg
 Peter Tost
 Michael Paryla
 Gabriele Adam
 Henry Lorenzen
 Lisa Helwig
 Fritz Wepper

See also
 List of films about angels

References

Bibliography
 Bock, Hans-Michael & Bergfelder, Tim. The Concise CineGraph. Encyclopedia of German Cinema. Berghahn Books, 2009.

External links 
 

1959 films
1950s fantasy comedy films
German fantasy comedy films
West German films
1950s German-language films
Films directed by Kurt Hoffmann
Films based on British novels
Remakes of British films
Films about angels
German black-and-white films
Constantin Film films
Films shot at Bavaria Studios
1959 comedy films
1950s German films